Yuliya Gladysheva (born 4 December 1981) is a Russian ice hockey player. She competed in the women's tournaments at the 2002 Winter Olympics and the 2006 Winter Olympics.

References

1981 births
Living people
Russian women's ice hockey forwards
Olympic ice hockey players of Russia
Ice hockey players at the 2002 Winter Olympics
Ice hockey players at the 2006 Winter Olympics
Ice hockey people from Moscow